Mam Seyf ol Din (also Romanized as Mam Seyf ol Dīn, Mam Seyf od Dīn, and Mām Sefod Dīn; also known as  Mamsevedar, Mamsevedor, and Mamsūh Dār) is a village in Zu ol Faqr Rural District, Sarshiv District, Saqqez County, Kurdistan Province, Iran. At the 2006 census, its population was 121, in 22 families. The village is populated by Kurds.

References 

Towns and villages in Saqqez County
Kurdish settlements in Kurdistan Province